Pingtai may refer to the following locations in China:

 Pingtai, Guangdong, town in Yunan County
 Pingtai, Jilin, town in Taobei District, Baicheng
 Pingtai Railway Station (平台站), postal code 137002, station on the Baicheng–Arxan Railway in Baicheng, Jilin
 Pingtai Subdistrict, Liangyuan District, Shangqiu, Henan